Warren Joseph Saunders (18 July 1934 – 1 March 2023) was an Australian cricketer. A batsman and occasional wicket-keeper, he played 35 first-class matches for New South Wales between 1955–56 and 1964–65.

Although Saunders was a consistent scorer for New South Wales, he never scored a century. In January 1964, he top-scored in both innings against Victoria, making 87 and 98. He retired from first-class cricket during the 1964–65 season to concentrate on his insurance business. However, he continued to play for St George in Sydney Grade Cricket, reaching 10,000 runs for the club in 1971–72.

Saunders died on 1 March 2023, at the age of 88.

References

External links
 

1934 births
2023 deaths
Australian cricketers
New South Wales cricketers
Cricketers from Sydney